Dennis Geiger (born 10 June 1998) is a German professional footballer who plays as a midfielder for Bundesliga club 1899 Hoffenheim.

References

External links

1998 births
Living people
German footballers
Association football midfielders
TSG 1899 Hoffenheim players
Bundesliga players
Germany youth international footballers
Germany under-21 international footballers
Footballers from Baden-Württemberg